"Shiroi Sekai" ("White World") is Jun Shibata's tenth single. It was released on February 23, 2005, and peaked at #31 in Japan.

Track listing
Shiroi Sekai(白い世界; White World)
Shuuden (終電; Last Train)

Charts

External links
Shibata Jun official website 

2005 singles
Jun Shibata songs